The men's field hockey tournament at the 1984 Summer Olympics was the 15th edition of the field hockey event for men at the Summer Olympics. It was held from 29 July to 11 August 1984.

Pakistan won the gold medal for the third time by defeating West Germany 2–1 in the final. Great Britain won the bronze medal by defeating Australia 3–2.

Squads

Umpires

I Almohandis (EGY)
Santiago Deo (ESP)
Ian Faulkner (NZL)
Louismichel Gillet (FRA)
Gerrit Hagels (NED)
Richard Kentwell (NED)
Rob Lathouwers (NED)
Jack Marjanovic (AUS)
Dennis Meredith (AUS)
Graham Nash (ENG)
Obaidullah (IND)
K O'Connor (CAN)
J Perera (SRI)
Alain Renaud (FRA)
Iwo Sakaida (JPN)
Horacio Servetto (ARG)
Alexander Stelter (FRG)
Shams-uz Zamman (PAK)

Preliminary round

Group A

Group B

Classification round

Ninth to twelfth place classification

9–12th place semi-finals

Eleventh place game

Ninth place game

Fifth to eighth place classification

5–8th place semi-finals

Seventh place game

Fifth place game

Medal round

Semi-finals

Bronze medal match

Gold medal match

Statistics

Final standings

Goalscorers

References

External links
Official website

Men's tournament
Men's events at the 1984 Summer Olympics